Tupouto'a (died 1820) was the ruler of Haʻapai, Tonga from 1808 to 1820 and the father of the first king of Tonga, Tāufā'ahāu (George Tupou I).

References

1820 deaths
Year of birth unknown
People from Haʻapai